Kesecik is a village in the Çamlıyayla district of Mersin Province, Turkey. It a situated in the Taurus Mountains  to east of Çamlıyayla. The population of Kesecik was 207 as of 2012.

References

Villages in Çamlıyayla District